One By Two is a  1993 Telugu-language comedy film directed by Shiva Nageswara Rao. The film stars Srikanth (in his lead debut)  and J. D. Chakravarthy in prominent roles. The film was a box office success.

Cast

Srikanth as Balaji
J. D. Chakravarthy as Babji
Nirosha
Uttara
Suryakantham
Nagesh
Sudhakar as Abbulu
Babu Mohan as Babloo
Banerji		
Tanikella Bharani		
Brahmanandam	
Rallapalli		
Srilakshmi		
AVS		
Dharmavarapu Subramanyam
Sudhakar		
Suthi Velu		
Vijaya Y.

Soundtrack

References

External links
 

1993 films
1990s Telugu-language films
Films directed by Siva Nageswara Rao